Madonna and Child with Two Saints or Madonna and Child with Saint Anthony Abbot and Saint George is a panel painting by Pisanello, executed c. 1445, now in the National Gallery, London. It is his only signed panel work ("Pisanus").

It was recorded in the Costabili collection in Ferrara in 1841 before being bought in 1862 by Sir Charles Eastlake, whose widow left it to the National Gallery five years later.

References

1445 paintings
Paintings by Pisanello
Paintings of the Madonna and Child
Collections of the National Gallery, London
Paintings of Saint George (martyr)
Paintings of Anthony the Great